A. E. Kaye (died  on February 3, 1987) was a sound engineer. He was nominated for an Academy Award in the category Best Sound Recording for the film The Girl Said No.

Selected filmography
 The Girl Said No (1937)

References

External links

Year of birth missing
1987 deaths
Audio production engineers